Hackars's five-toed skink (Leptosiaphos hackarsi) is a species of lizard in the family Scincidae. It is found in Democratic Republic of the Congo and Uganda.

References

Leptosiaphos
Reptiles described in 1941
Taxa named by Gaston-François de Witte